Padež is a village in the Municipality of Zagorje ob Savi in central Slovenia. The area is part of the traditional region of Lower Carniola. It is now included with the rest of the municipality in the Central Sava Statistical Region.

The local church is dedicated to Saint James and belongs to the Parish of Šentjurij–Podkum. It is a Gothic building with various later modifications.

References

External links
Padež on Geopedia

Populated places in the Municipality of Zagorje ob Savi